James Waldegrave may refer to:
 James Waldegrave, 1st Earl Waldegrave, British diplomat
 James Waldegrave, 2nd Earl Waldegrave, British politician
 James Waldegrave, 13th Earl Waldegrave, British peer and businessman